José Humberto Ugarte Miranda (born 2 November 1980 in Liberia) is a Costa Rican football player.

Club career
Ugarte played for Alajuelense and hometown club Municipal Liberia before joining Herediano in summer 2002. He returned to Liberia a year later and was released by the club in summer 2008.

International career
Ugarte played for Costa Rica in 1997 FIFA U-17 World Championship and 1999 FIFA World Youth Championship but failed to make the senior team.

References

1980 births
Living people
People from Guanacaste Province
Association football forwards
Costa Rican footballers
Costa Rica under-20 international footballers
Costa Rican people of Basque descent
Costa Rican people of Spanish descent
L.D. Alajuelense footballers
Municipal Liberia footballers
C.S. Herediano footballers
Liga FPD players